Taridin Ridge (‘Hrebet Taridin’ \'hre-bet ta-ri-'din\) is the rocky Y-shaped ridge extending 20 km in east-west direction, 7.15 km wide, and rising to 1379 m (Mount Mayhew) in central Aristotle Mountains on Oscar II Coast in Graham Land.  It surmounts Pequod Glacier to the north and Starbuck Glacier to the south.  The feature is named after Taridin, governor in Southwestern Bulgaria under Czar Boris I and Czar Simeon I (9th-10th century).

Location
British mapping in 1976.

Maps
 British Antarctic Territory.  Scale 1:200000 topographic map.  DOS 610 Series, Sheet W 65 62.  Directorate of Overseas Surveys, Tolworth, UK, 1976.
 Antarctic Digital Database (ADD). Scale 1:250000 topographic map of Antarctica. Scientific Committee on Antarctic Research (SCAR). Since 1993, regularly upgraded and updated.

Notes

References
 Taridin Ridge. SCAR Composite Antarctic Gazetteer.
 Bulgarian Antarctic Gazetteer. Antarctic Place-names Commission. (details in Bulgarian, basic data in English)

External links
 Taridin Ridge. Copernix satellite image

Ridges of Graham Land
Oscar II Coast
Bulgaria and the Antarctic